Ethel May Smith (July 5, 1907 – December 31, 1979) was a sprinter from Canada who won two medals at the Amsterdam 1928 Summer Olympics: a bronze medal in the 100 m, and a gold team medal in the 4 × 100 m relay.

Smith was born into a poor family and quit school in the eighth grade to work at the Toronto's Garment District. She won the 220 yards at the national championships in 1927 and the 60 yards at the Ontario Championships in 1929. The same year she retired from competitions.

References

1907 births
1979 deaths
Athletes (track and field) at the 1928 Summer Olympics
Canadian female sprinters
Canadian people of British descent
Olympic track and field athletes of Canada
Olympic bronze medalists for Canada
Olympic gold medalists for Canada
Athletes from Toronto
Medalists at the 1928 Summer Olympics
Olympic gold medalists in athletics (track and field)
Olympic bronze medalists in athletics (track and field)
Olympic female sprinters